Wemotaci Atikamekw Council (French: Conseil des Atikamekw de Wemotaci) is the band council of the Atikamekw of Wemotaci, Quebec. In 2016, the band has a registered population of 1,918 members. It has two Indian reserves: Coucoucache 24A and the community of Wemotaci where it is headquartered.

References

External links
 Official website 
 First Nation Detail by Indigenous and Northern Affairs Canada

Algonquian peoples
Atikamekw
First Nations governments in Quebec